This is a list of years in Portuguese television.

Twenty-first century

Twentieth century

See also 
 List of years in Portugal
 List of years in television

Television
Television in Portugal by year
Portuguese television